Mathula is a community council located in the Mafeteng District of Lesotho. Its population in 2006 was 17,867.

Villages
The community of Mathula includes the villages of Boiketlo, Boikhutso, Boithatelo, Ha Bereng, Ha Fako, Ha Kabai, Ha Khabo, Ha Lenake, Ha Lesoma, Ha Letuma, Ha Mabula, Ha Majoro, Ha Makholela, Ha Masupha (Lipatolong), Ha Matsa, Ha Mokhothu, Ha Mokoena, Ha Molise, Ha Moseli, Ha Mosotho, Ha Moteletsane, Ha Mphatle, Ha Nkheche, Ha Ntaba, Ha Paki, Ha Phatsane, Ha Rabolilana, Ha Raletebele, Ha Raletooane, Ha Ramabilikoe, Ha Ramatšeliso, Ha Ramokhele, Ha Ramorake, Ha Ramoreki, Ha Ramosiee, Ha Ramosoeunyane, Ha Rannakoe, Ha Salemone, Ha Seeiso, Ha Sekhaupane, Ha Sekheke, Ha Senatla, Ha Serobo, Ha Shale, Ha Thahanyane, Ha Thamae, Ha Tjopa, Ha Tšiu, Ha Tšoeute, Khophocha, Lekhalong, Letšeng, Lihlookong, Likotopong, Lithabaneng, Maholokoane, Makeoane, Makokotoaneng, Manganeng, Mathebe, Mohau-Oa-Pelo, Moreneng, Morunyaneng, Nkoaneng, Sekantšing, Takalatsa, Thaba-Tsoeu Ha Mafa, Thabaneng, Top Centre and Tsoaing.

References

External links
 Google map of community villages

Populated places in Mafeteng District